The 2016 All-Big 12 Conference football team consists of American football players chosen as All-Big 12 Conference players for the 2016 Big 12 Conference football season.  The conference recognizes two official All-Big 12 selectors: (1) the Big 12 conference coaches selected separate offensive and defensive units and named first- and second-team players (the "Coaches" team); and (2) a panel of sports writers and broadcasters covering the Big 12 also selected offensive and defensive units and named first- and second-team players (the "Media" team).

Offensive selections

Quarterbacks
 Baker Mayfield, Oklahoma (Coaches-1; Media-1)
 Patrick Mahomes II, Texas Tech (Coaches-2; Media-2)

Running backs
 D'Onta Foreman, Texas (Coaches-1; Media-1)
 Joe Mixon, Oklahoma (Coaches-1; Media-1)
 Samaje Perine, Oklahoma (Coaches-2; Media-2)
 Justin Crawford, West Virginia (Media-2)
 Justice Hill, Oklahoma State (Coaches-2)

Fullbacks
 Winston Dimel, Kansas State (Coaches-1)
 Dimitri Flowers, Oklahoma (Coaches-2)

Centers
 Tyler Orlosky, West Virginia (Coaches-1; Media-1)
 Kyle Fuller, Baylor (Coaches-1; Media-2)
 Austin Schlottmann, TCU (Coaches-2)

Guards
 Terrale Johnson, Kansas State (Media-1)
 Kyle Bosch, West Virginia (Media-1)
 Ben Powers, Oklahoma (Media-2)
 Adam Pankey, West Virginia (Media-2)
 Kent Perkins, Texas (Coaches-2)

Tackles
 Connor Williams, Texas (Coaches-1; Media-1)
 Orlando Brown, Oklahoma (Coaches-1; Media-1)
 Dalton Risner, Kansas State (Coaches-1; Media-2)
 Victor Salako, Oklahoma State (Coaches-2; Media-2)
 Nick Fett, Iowa State (Coaches-2)
 Zach Crabtree, Oklahoma State (Coaches-2)

Tight ends
 Mark Andrews, Oklahoma (Coaches-1; Media-1)
 Blake Jarwin, Oklahoma State (Coaches-2; Media-2)

Receivers
 Dede Westbrook, Oklahoma (Coaches-1; Media-1)
 James Washington, Oklahoma State (Coaches-1; Media-1)
 K. D. Cannon, Baylor (Coaches-1; Media-2)
 Allen Lazard, Iowa State (Coaches-1)
 Jonathan Giles, Texas Tech (Coaches-2; Media-2)
 Shelton Gibson, West Virginia (Coaches-2)
 Daikiel Shorts Jr., West Virginia (Coaches-2)

Defensive selections

Defensive linemen
 Jordan Willis, Kansas State (Coaches-1; Media-1)
 Dorance Armstrong Jr., Kansas (Coaches-1; Media-1)
 Vincent Taylor, Oklahoma State (Media-1; Coaches-1)
 Will Geary, Kansas State (Media-1)
 K. J. Smith, Baylor (Coaches-1)
 Josh Carraway, TCU (Coaches-1; Media-2)
 Jhaustin Thomas, Iowa State (Coaches-2)
 Demond Tucker, Iowa State (Coaches-2)
 Jordan Wade, Oklahoma (Coaches-2)
 Aaron Curry, TCU (Coaches-2; Media-2)
 Breckyn Hager, Texas (Coaches-2; Media-2)
 Daniel Wise, Kansas (Media-2)

Linebackers
 Elijah Lee, Kansas State (Coaches-1; Media-1)
 Jordan Evans, Oklahoma (Coaches-1; Media-1)
 Travin Howard, TCU (Coaches-1; Media-1)
 Ogbonnia Okoronkwo, Oklahoma (Coaches-2; Media-2)
 Chad Whitener, Oklahoma State (Coaches-2)
 Ty Summers, TCU (Coaches-2)
 Devante Averette, Oklahoma St (Media-2)
 Malik Jefferson, Texas (Media-2)

Defensive backs
 Rasul Douglas, West Virginia (Coaches-1; Media-1)
 Jordan Thomas, Oklahoma (Coaches-1; Media-1)
 Jordan Sterns, Oklahoma State (Coaches-1; Media-1)
 D. J. Reed, Kansas State (Coaches-1; Media-2)
 Fish Smithson, Kansas (Coaches-1; Media-2)
 Denzel Johnson, TCU (Coaches-2; Media-2)
 Orion Stewart, Baylor (Media-1)
 Patrick Levels, Baylor (Coaches-2)
 Kamari Cotton-Moya, Iowa State (Coaches-2)
 Tre Flowers, Oklahoma State (Coaches-2)
 Nick Orr, TCU (Coaches-2)
 Ranthony Texada, TCU (Media-2)

Special teams

Kickers
 Cole Netten, Iowa State (Coaches-1; Media-1)
 Ben Grogan, Oklahoma State (Coaches-2; Media-2)

Punters
 Michael Dickson, Texas (Coaches-1; Media-1)
 Zach Sinor, Oklahoma State (Coaches-2; Media-2)

All-purpose / Return specialists
 Shelton Gibson, West Virginia (Media-1)
 Byron Pringle, Kansas State (Coaches-1)
 Joe Mixon, Oklahoma (Media-2)
 Dede Westbrook, Oklahoma (Coaches-2)

Key
Bold = selected as a first-team player by both the coaches and media panel

Coaches = selected by Big 12 Conference coaches

Media = selected by a media panel

See also
2016 College Football All-America Team

References

All-Big 12 Conference
All-Big 12 Conference football teams